Plinthograptis is a genus of moths belonging to the family Tortricidae.

Species
Plinthograptis clostos Razowksi, 1990
Plinthograptis clyster Razowski, 1990
Plinthograptis ebogana Razowski, 2005
Plinthograptis iitae Razowski, 2013
Plinthograptis pleroma Razowski, 1981
Plinthograptis rhytisma Razowski, 1981
Plinthograptis seladonia (Razowski, 1981)
Plinthograptis sipalia Razowski, 1981

See also
List of Tortricidae genera

References

 , 2005: World Catalogue of Insects vol. 5 Tortricidae.
 , 1981: Nigerian Tortricini (Lepidoptera, Tortricidae). RAZOWSKI, Acta Zoologica Cracoviensia 25 (14): 319–340.
 , 1990: Descriptions and notes on tropical Tortricini (Lepidoptera: Tortricidae). Acta Zoologica Cracoviensia 33 (28): 575–594.
 , 2005: Notes and descriptions of primitive Tortricini from Tropical Africa, with a list of Asian taxa (Lepidoptera: Tortricidae). Shilap Revista de Lepidopterologia 33 (132): 423–436.

External links
tortricidae.com

Tortricidae genera
Taxa named by Józef Razowski
Tortricini